Mount St. Joseph Girls' College is a Catholic Girls College located in Maidstone Street, Altona, Victoria, Australia. Mount St. Joseph Girls’ College is one of few schools in Australia that is a Josephite college, founded by the Josephite Order in 1964.

History

Beginnings 
In the early 1960s, the Sisters of St Joseph of the Sacred Heart made plans for a school for young women in the western suburbs of Melbourne. The school was built in Altona West and opened in February 1964.

The logo at Mount St Joseph Girls' College is a white lily, and the College motto is 'Virtue Courage'.

Previous Principals 
The College has seen 10 principals since its foundation, 7 of which were Sisters of St Joseph of the Sacred Heart:

 Mary John Forster RSJ (Founding Principal): 1964–1967
 Romuald Pierce RSJ: 1967–1970
 Anne O'Brien RSJ: 1971
 Nora Finucane RSJ: 1971–1973
 Giovanni Farquer RSJ: 1974–981
 Margaret Blampied RSJ: 1982–1985
 Helen T Reed RSJ: 1986–2002
 Regina Byrne: 2002–2008
 Catherine Dillon: 2008–2015
 Kate Dishon: 2016–present

Sport 
There are 6 house colours which coincide with the pride flag for sport days and college events, which are:

PENOLA (yellow) 
Named after the town in South Australia where Mary MacKillop and Julian Tenison Woods established the order of the Sisters of St Joseph and the first Josephite school.

KINCUMBER (blue) 
Named after the town north of Sydney, where the Sisters of St Joseph opened an orphanage for street children in 1887.

McCORMACK (green) 
Named after Irene McCormack who worked in the village of Huasihuasi, Peru and was fatally shot by members of a guerilla rebel group on May 21, 1991.

SOLOMON (red) 
Named after Emmanuel Solomon, a wealthy Jewish philanthropist who generously supported the poor and disadvantaged.

CAMERON (orange) 
Named after Mary MacKillop's relatives, the Cameron's, whom she was governess for when she moved to Penola at the age of 18.

PROVIDENCE (purple) 
During the early years of the Sisters of St Joseph of the Sacred Heart's work across Australia, the Sisters established a number of Houses of Providence. These houses served as a refuge for young women and children who did not have access to a safe home or food.

Homerooms 
There are seven homerooms at junior levels (7-9) into which the students are divided, in each year level; Anne, Catherine, Francis, Joseph, Therese, Veronica & Ignatius. These homerooms are named after saints, as this is a Catholic school.

In the senior year levels (10-12) students are divided into homerooms based on their house colour, then divided into three groups, such as Cameron 1, Cameron 2, and Cameron 3.

Curriculum 
Mount St Joseph Girls' College has a various selection of subjects from years 7–12 which include the following:

 Accounting
 Art
 Biology
 Business Management
 Chemistry
 Drama
 English
 English Language
 English Literature
 English as an Additional Language
 Food and Technology
 French
 Further Mathematics
 Health & Human Development
 Humanities
 Feminism
 History 
 Geography
 Civics and Citizenship
 Women in Politics
 Information Technology
 International Studies
 Italian
 Japanese
 LGBTQI Rights
 Religion and Society
 Laboratory Skills
 Legal Studies
 Maths Methods
 Media
 Music
 Outdoor Education
 Physical Education
 Physics
 Psychology
 Specialist Mathematics
 Text & Traditions
 Textiles & Design Multimedia
 Visual Communications, and more.

Size and future 
I2021, Mount St. Joseph Girls' College has approximately 1135 students and over 130 staff, and maintains steady numbers through drawing from Catholic feeder schools throughout Melbourne, which stretches from Footscray and Yarraville to the east and city areas such as: Hoppers Crossing, Point Cook, Altona Meadows, Altona and Werribee in the west.  There are usually waiting lists for enrolment to the school.

MSJ has made a lot of changes in the past years including new outdoor seating areas, a Performing Arts Centre for drama and music, a student cafe, an athletics track, and a new Science and Technology Centre. As of 2021, there has been major developments in building facilities, prompting open and education-focused classrooms

Mount St. Joseph Girls' College has a strong emphasis on community, and as such, encourages past students to keep in contact through the website and facebook pages.

Victorian Certificate of Education (VCE)
Mount St. Joseph Girls' College offers a full range of VCE subjects. The students statistically, tend to do well in the VCE when compared to other schools in Altona.

See also 
 List of schools in Victoria

References

External links 
 Official site

Girls' schools in Victoria (Australia)
Catholic secondary schools in Melbourne
Educational institutions established in 1964
1964 establishments in Australia
Alliance of Girls' Schools Australasia
Buildings and structures in the City of Hobsons Bay